Tinea bothniella is a moth belonging to the family Tineidae. The species was first described by Svensson in 1953.

It is native to Northern Europe.

References

Tineinae
Moths described in 1953